Naryshevo (Narış) is a rural locality (a village) in Badrakovsky Selsoviet, Burayevsky District, Bashkortostan, Russia. The population was 106 as of 2010. There are 3 streets.

Geography 
Naryshevo is located 25 km south of Burayevo (the district's administrative centre) by road. Starobikmetovo is the nearest rural locality.

References 

Rural localities in Burayevsky District